Remco Evenepoel (born 25 January 2000) is a Belgian cyclist, who currently rides for UCI WorldTeam .

He is the son of Patrick Evenepoel, a former racing cyclist who won the 1993 Grand Prix de Wallonie. Remco Evenepoel started his sport career in association football, playing for the youth teams of R.S.C. Anderlecht and PSV Eindhoven, as well as being featured in the youth national teams of Belgium. Realising that his physical abilities made him more suited for cycling, he switched to the discipline in 2017.

Evenepoel won the 2022 Vuelta a España and the 2022 UCI World Road Race Championships two weeks later.

Career

Junior career
The son of the former professional cyclist Patrick Evenepoel, Remco Evenepoel started his sporting career as a football player. At the age of five he joined Anderlecht. When he was eleven years old he changed to the youth academy of PSV Eindhoven returning to Anderlecht again at the age of fourteen. He played four times for the Belgian U15 team and five times for the Belgian U16. After some setbacks and disappointments he made a switch to cycling in 2017. He won both the time trial and road race at the 2018 European Junior Road Cycling Championships. The gap between him and the second place rider in the road race was 9 minutes and 44 seconds.

Later in the year, Evenepoel also won both the road race and the time trial at the UCI Junior Road World Championships.

Deceuninck–Quick-Step

2019

Electing to skip the under-23 ranks, Evenepoel announced in July 2018 that he would join  for the 2019 season. For his first season, Evenepoel was scheduled to compete in shorter stage races, and skipped the cobbled, one-day Classic races. In his debut race, the Vuelta a San Juan, Evenepoel won the young rider classification and 9th overall whilst also winning his first professional podium in the stage 3 time trial behind teammate Julian Alaphilippe and Valerio Conti. Evenepoel's first professional victory came at the Tour of Belgium, where he won the general classification as well as a stage and the points classification. On 3 August 2019 Evenepoel scored his first World Tour victory when he won the Clásica de San Sebastián. He became the third-youngest rider ever to win a cycling classic in the history of the sport. On 8 August 2019, Evenepoel won the time trial at the 2019 European Road Championships. At the World Championships in September, Evenepoel would have been eligible to still ride in the under-23 category, but decided against it and started in the elite men's events. He went on to win the silver medal in the time trial. He spent much of the year sharing a room with Philippe Gilbert who acted in a mentoring role.

2020
Evenepoel started the 2020 season at the Vuelta a San Juan, where he won the individual time trial on stage 3 and the general classification. He then competed at the Volta ao Algarve. Here, he won stage 2 as well as the final stage, a time trial, to clinch overall victory ahead of Maximilian Schachmann.

After the extended break in the cycling calendar due to the COVID-19 pandemic, he won the Vuelta a Burgos and the Tour de Pologne.

Evenepoel suffered a serious accident at Il Lombardia. While descending the Muro di Sormano and after a sharp curve, he collided with a low wall on the side of a bridge and was thrown over it with the impact, falling in a dirt area near some trees, several meters below the road. No other cyclists were involved in the accident and he was swiftly removed from the scene by the emergency services, being conscious and responsive all the time. Hours later, his team reported that he had suffered a fractured pelvis and a right lung contusion, also stating that he would not be returning to competition in the near future.

2021
Evenepoel returned to competition in the 2021 Giro d'Italia, finishing 7th in the prologue time trial, after which he said: "I was standing on the start ramp with some tears in my eyes. It was a hard way to come back and start the Giro like this. But immediately a top-10 spot, I didn’t expect it – I’m really happy." After spending the first 15 stages in the top-10 of the general classification, he crashed during stage 17 and was unable to continue the race.

He competed in the rescheduled 2020 Summer Olympics in Tokyo in both the road race and time trial earning a top 10 place in the latter. During the 2021 World Championships in Flanders he claimed his second elite level world championship medal, taking the bronze in the time trial. Evenepoel was the centre of a furore in the World road race. Ahead of the race, it was felt that Wout van Aert was the protected leader for a Belgian team that was very hopeful of a home win, and Eddy Merckx stated to Het Nieuwsblad that "If there is only one leader, you really shouldn't take Evenepoel [...] He rides mainly for himself; we saw that at the Olympics". Evenepoel responded "He always has to say something and that's a shame [...] Maybe it stings that I didn't ride for his son's team. I have a lot of respect for Eddy and apparently that is not mutual." On the race ahead "I'm here to work for Belgium, for Wout, because I know that it's the chance of his life to be world champion. He's in the form of his life, and it would be stupid of me to ride for myself. On this parcours, no one is stronger than Wout. I said already a lot of times that I will do everything [for] Wout."

In the road race Evenepoel appeared to answer Merckx' criticism that he is a selfish cyclist by joining an early attack with 180 km still to race, followed by a second mid-race attack, and then created the decisive selection in the finals laps. Van Aert was unable to win the race, which was won by Julian Alaphilippe. After the race, people from the world of cycling such as Evenepoel's trade team boss Patrick Lefevere praised Evenepoel's strength and wondered if the Belgian team had made the wrong choice of leader. Lefevere asked: "[W]hy did the Belgians want to break open the race so early? And above all, why did they throw Remco into the fray so early? For me, Remco was the best man in the race after Julian. But they just sacrificed him and rolled out the red carpet for Julian."

Evenepoel responded to the criticism of Belgium's tactics by revealing that he felt could have won the race but that "[o]n Friday evening before the World Championships there was a meeting with everyone. It was very unclear to me what exactly was expected of me. So after sleeping on it, the next day I went to coaches Sven Vanthourenhout and Serge Pauwels and asked: 'What do you expect from me in concrete terms?' "I also said straight out that I thought I might be able to win the race in a certain scenario. 'Do I get a chance or not?' I asked. ‘No,’ was the answer." This caused a rift in the team; Van Aert said "I expected to hear criticism because we didn’t win but that it came from someone on the team is not smart and only serves to add fuel to the fire. It's a shame, and I regret it. Remco issued more criticism on TV than in the team meeting" and "He was the one who agreed with the tactics, who agreed with the selection. He has been preaching for weeks on end how he was looking forward to it so I think it's really weird to turn 180 degrees now".

Days after the race Belgian team-mate Jasper Stuyven said that Evenepoel had failed to show up for the team debrief: "Everyone was there, except Remco [...] He was aware, but didn't think it was necessary. I think that is a shame, especially because he thought it necessary to say things on TV. That stuck with some of us. [...] I think that Remco should sometimes be slowed down by his entourage. He still has to learn when he can and cannot say things. Also, a super-strong rider – which he certainly is – should realise that some things should remain internal."

2022

On 24 April, at the age of 22, Evenepoel won his first cycling monument in Liège–Bastogne–Liège after a 29.6 km solo effort with a 48-second lead on the runner-up. It was his first participation in this cycling classic. He completed the 257.1 km with an average speed of 41.397 km/h, which was the fastest edition in the history of La Doyenne. He won the 2022 Clásica de San Sebastián by launching a successful 44 kilometre solo attack, finishing nearly two minutes ahead of second-placed Pavel Sivakov.

In early September, Evenepoel won the 2022 Vuelta a España, his first Grand Tour triumph. Evenepoel took the red jersey after stage 6 of the race, which finished with a 800m climb to a mountain-top finish in San Miguel de Aguayo. While the stage was won by Jay Vine, Evenepoel managed to finish second, putting significant time into his general classification rivals, including Primož Roglič, the pre-race favorite. Evenepoel extended his general classification lead to 2 minutes and 41 seconds after a dominant performance on the stage 10 individual time trial, finishing the 30.9 km course in 33 minutes and 18 seconds, 48 seconds ahead of second-place Roglič. The following challenging mountain stages saw Roglič and Enric Mas claw back some time, reducing Evenepoel's general classification lead to as little as 1 minute and 26 seconds. However, following Roglič's withdrawal from the race after a crash at the end of stage 16, Evenepoel won stage 18, another mountain-top finish, securing a 2-minute and 7-second advantage over Mas, which would prove unassailable over the final 2 stages. Arriving in Madrid, Evenepoel's margin of victory was 2 minutes and 2 seconds over second place Mas and 4 minutes and 57 seconds over third place Juan Ayuso.

In September, Evenepoel competed in both the Individual Time Trial and Road Race at the 2022 UCI Road World Championships in Wollongong, Australia. He finished 3rd in the time trial, 9 seconds behind winner Tobias Foss. One week later, he won the road race, finishing two minutes and 21 seconds ahead of France's Christophe Laporte. Having made it into a breakaway with 32 km to go, Evenepoel managed to break free from Alexey Lutsenko with 25 km to go and ride solo to the finish for his first World Championship victory at the Elite level.

Career achievements

Major results

2017
 1st La Philippe Gilbert Juniors
 1st La Route des Géants
 Aubel–Thimister–La Gleize
1st  Points classification
1st Stage 2b
2018
 UCI Junior Road World Championships
1st  Road race
1st  Time trial
 UEC European Junior Road Championships
1st  Road race 
1st  Time trial
 National Junior Road Championships
1st  Road race
1st  Time trial
 1st  Overall Giro della Lunigiana
1st  Points classification
1st  Mountains classification
1st Stages 1a, 2 & 4
 1st  Overall Course de la Paix Juniors
1st  Points classification
1st  Mountains classification
1st Stages 2a (ITT) & 4
 1st  Overall GP Général Patton
1st  Points classification
1st  Mountains classification
1st Stages 1 & 2
 1st  Overall Aubel–Thimister–Stavelot
1st  Points classification
1st  Mountains classification
1st Stage 3
 1st  Overall Trophée Centre Morbihan
1st  Points classification
1st Stage 1
 1st Kuurne–Brussels–Kuurne Juniores
 1st Chrono des Nations Juniores
 1st Guido Reybrouck Classic
2019
 1st  Time trial, UEC European Road Championships
 1st  Overall Tour of Belgium
1st  Points classification
1st Stage 2
 1st Clásica de San Sebastián
 2nd  Time trial, UCI Road World Championships
 3rd Time trial, National Road Championships
 4th Overall Tour of Turkey
 8th Overall Adriatica Ionica Race
1st Stage 3
 9th Overall Vuelta a San Juan
1st  Young rider classification
2020
 1st  Overall Volta ao Algarve
1st  Young rider classification
1st Stages 2 & 5 (ITT)
 1st  Overall Tour de Pologne
1st Stage 4
 1st  Overall Vuelta a Burgos
1st  Young rider classification
1st Stage 3
 1st  Overall Vuelta a San Juan
1st  Young rider classification
1st Stage 3 (ITT)
2021
 1st  Overall Danmark Rundt
1st  Young rider classification
1st Stages 3 & 5 (ITT)
 1st  Overall Tour of Belgium
1st Stage 2 (ITT)
 1st Brussels Cycling Classic
 1st Coppa Bernocchi
 1st Druivenkoers Overijse
 UEC European Road Championships
2nd  Road race
3rd  Time trial
 National Road Championships
2nd Time trial
3rd Road race 
 3rd  Time trial, UCI Road World Championships
 5th Giro dell'Emilia
 5th Chrono des Nations
 9th Time trial, Olympic Games
2022
 UCI Road World Championships
1st  Road race
3rd  Time trial
 1st  Time trial, National Road Championships
 1st  Overall Vuelta a España
1st  Young rider classification
1st Stages 10 (ITT) & 18
 1st  Overall Tour of Norway
1st  Young rider classification
1st Stages 1, 3 & 5
 1st  Overall Volta ao Algarve
1st  Young rider classification
1st Stage 4 (ITT)
 1st Liège–Bastogne–Liège
 1st Clásica de San Sebastián
 1st Gullegem Koerse
 1st Stage 8 (ITT) Tour de Suisse
 2nd Overall Volta a la Comunitat Valenciana
1st  Young rider classification
1st Stage 1
 4th Overall Tour of the Basque Country
1st  Young rider classification
 6th Brabantse Pijl
2023
 1st  Overall UAE Tour
1st  Young rider classification
 1st Stage 2 (TTT)
 7th Overall Vuelta a San Juan

General classification results timeline

Classics results timeline

Major championships timeline

Records 

 Monument winner, Grand Tour winner and UCI World Champion in 1 year: 2022 (record shared with Alfredo Binda, Eddy Merckx and Bernard Hinault)
 Winner of the UCI Junior Road World Championship and the UCI Road World Championship: 2018 and 2022 (record shared with Greg LeMond)

Honours and awards
Crystal Bicycle – Best Young Rider: 2018
Belgian Promising Talent of the Year 2018
Belgian Sportsman of the Year: 2019, 2022
Crystal Bicycle – Best Professional Cyclist: 2019, 2022
Flandrien of the Year: 2022
Belgian National Sports Merit Award: 2022
Vélo d'Or: 2022
Vlaamse Reus: 2022 
Flemish Sportsjewel: 2022
HLN/VTM Belgian of the Year: 2022
A statue on the Fóia mountain in Portugal was based on Evenepoel's victory in stage 2 of the 2020 Volta ao Algarve

References

External links

 
 
 
 
 
 

2000 births
Association footballers not categorized by position
Belgian Vuelta a España stage winners
Belgian footballers
Belgian male cyclists
Cyclists at the 2020 Summer Olympics
Danmark Rundt winners
Living people
Olympic cyclists of Belgium
R.S.C. Anderlecht players
Sportspeople from Aalst, Belgium
Cyclists from East Flanders
Tour de Suisse stage winners
Vuelta a España winners
21st-century Belgian people
UCI Road World Champions (elite men)